Thornycrofts (Woolston) F.C. were an English amateur football club, based in Woolston, Southampton. The club was formed by employees of John I. Thornycroft & Company, the Woolston-based shipbuilders and was active from 1917 to 1926, during which time it was a member of the Hampshire League, other than in 1920–21 when the club joined the Southern League. The club played regularly in the qualifying rounds of the FA Cup and in 1920 took Burnley to a replay.

History
The club was founded during the First World War and participated in the South Hants War League in 1917–18 and 1918–19, finishing second and third respectively.

In 1919, the club joined the Hampshire League and entered the qualifying rounds of the FA Cup, coached by former Southampton player, Jim Angell. After victories over Dulwich Hamlet (won 3–1) and Sheppey United (won 4–0), the club were drawn against Burnley. The match, on 10 January 1920, was played at The Dell and ended in a goalless draw. In the replay three days later, Burnley's pedigree and experience prevailed, winning 5–0, with three goals from James Lindsay.

In 1920, the Southern League underwent a complete re-organisation, with most of the professional teams leaving to form the new Football League Third Division. Thornycroft were elected to join the new English section of the league, but after only four victories from 24 matches, they finished at the bottom of the league table and returned to the Hampshire League.

They continued to enter the qualifying rounds of the FA Cup until 1925 and folded the following year. A new club, Vosper Thorneycroft F.C. was formed in 1960.

References

Defunct football clubs in England
Defunct football clubs in Hampshire
Southern Football League clubs
Association football clubs disestablished in 1926
Association football clubs established in 1917
Sport in Southampton
1917 establishments in England